Bulbophyllum guttulatum (small-spotted bulbophyllum) is a species of orchid.

References

guttulatum